Scheler is a surname. Notable people with the surname include:

Bernt Scheler (born 1955), Swedish cyclist
Jean Auguste Ulric Scheler (1819–1890), Belgian philologist
Lucien Scheler (1902-1999), French author
Max Scheler (1874-1928), German philosopher
Walter Scheler (1923-2008), German clerical worker
Werner Scheler (born 1923), German physician
Fritz Scheler (1925-2002), German physician, nephrologist